Michael Carl Bryan (born April 29, 1978) is an American former doubles world No. 1 tennis player. With his twin brother Bob, he was the world's top doubles player for more than nine years, first achieving the top ranking in September 2003. They became the second men's doubles team to complete the career Golden Slam by winning the 2012 London Olympics. Bryan holds the records for the most major men's doubles titles at 18, the most ATP Tour men's doubles titles (123), and the most weeks (506) ranked as the doubles world No. 1. He won all but five of his doubles titles with his brother; partnering Jack Sock, he won two majors and the year-end championship in 2018, as well as the 2018 ATP World Tour Fans' Favorite Doubles Team.

Tennis career

College
Mike Bryan played for Stanford University in 1997 and 1998, where he helped the Cardinal win back-to-back NCAA team championships. In 1998, he won the NCAA doubles title with his twin brother Bob.

Professional

Together with his twin brother Bob, he has been very successful in doubles. They have won 119 doubles titles (winning their record-setting 86th title at the 2013 BNP Paribas Open in California, USA) including a record 16 Grand Slam titles. In 2005, he and Bob made it to the finals of all four Grand Slam tournaments, only the second time such a feat has been achieved in the Open era. The Bryan Brothers have been ranked No. 1 in the ATP. Due to their success, they have been nicknamed The Wonder Twins after a fictional comic book duo.

During the 2018 Madrid Open, Bob injured his hip and subsequently had season ending surgery. In his brother's absence, Mike partnered with several other players, namely Sam Querrey at Roland Garros, Jack Sock at Queen's, Wimbledon and the US Open, Ryan Harrison during the Davis Cup, and with James Cerretani, Frances Tiafoe and Édouard Roger-Vasselin at other tour events.

World TeamTennis

Both brothers kicked off their World TeamTennis careers back in 1999 for the Idaho Sneakers. They went on to play for the Newport Beach Breakers in 2004, the Kansas City Explorers from 2005-2012, the Texas Wild in 2013, the San Diego Aviators in 2014, the California Dream in 2015, the Washington Kastles from 2016-2018, and most recently the Vegas Rollers in 2019. They have two World TeamTennis titles, one from the Newport Beach Breakers in 2004, and another from the Kansas City Explorers in 2010. It was announced that Mike, along with twin brother Bob, will be joining the Vegas Rollers during the 2020 WTT season set to begin July 12 at The Greenbrier.

Davis Cup record (28–5)
Together with his twin brother Bob Bryan, the pair has won the most Davis Cup matches of any team in doubles for the United States. Mike also owns U.S. Davis Cup records with 27 individual doubles wins and 32 ties played.

Grand Slam finals

Doubles: 32 (18 titles, 14 runner-ups)
By winning the 2006 Wimbledon title, Bryan completed the men's doubles Career Grand Slam. He became the 19th individual player and, with Bob Bryan, the seventh doubles pair to achieve this. In 2012, by winning the Olympic gold medal, along with his brother, Mike completed the career "Golden Slam", as did Bob. They are the only team that has ever accomplished this.

Mixed doubles: 6 (4 titles, 2 runner-ups)

Year-end championship finals

Doubles: 7 (5 titles, 2 runner-ups)

Summer Olympics finals

Doubles: 2 (1 gold medal, 1 bronze medal)

Mixed doubles: 1 (1 bronze medal)

ATP Masters 1000 finals

Doubles: 59 (39 titles, 20 runner-ups)

Performance timelines

Doubles

Mixed doubles

ATP Tour career earnings

Private life
Bryan is married to Nadia née Murgašová, who is from Trenčín, Slovakia. The couple resides in Florida, and together they have a son. The family shares a summer residence in Trenčín, sharing the street with Stanley Cup winners Marián Hossa, Marián Gáborík and Zdeno Chára.

See also

 Bob and Mike Bryan
 List of twins

References

External links
 Official website
 
 
 
 
 Profile on the 60 Minutes news magazine broadcast March 21, 2010.

 
1978 births
Living people
American male tennis players
Australian Open (tennis) champions
French Open champions
Identical twins
Olympic bronze medalists for the United States in tennis
People from Pasco County, Florida
People from Camarillo, California
Stanford Cardinal men's tennis players
Tennis players at the 1999 Pan American Games
Tennis players at the 2004 Summer Olympics
Tennis players at the 2008 Summer Olympics
Tennis players at the 2012 Summer Olympics
Tennis people from California
Tennis people from Florida
US Open (tennis) champions
Wimbledon champions
US Open (tennis) junior champions
Olympic gold medalists for the United States in tennis
Pan American Games bronze medalists for the United States
Grand Slam (tennis) champions in mixed doubles
Grand Slam (tennis) champions in men's doubles
Medalists at the 2012 Summer Olympics
Medalists at the 2008 Summer Olympics
Twin sportspeople
American twins
Pan American Games medalists in tennis
Sportspeople from Ventura County, California
Grand Slam (tennis) champions in boys' doubles
Medalists at the 1999 Pan American Games
ATP number 1 ranked doubles tennis players
ITF World Champions